Adib (also spelled Adeeb) (Arabic:أديب) is a given name and a surname meaning enlighted writer or one who practises adab. Notable people having this name:

Given name

Adeeb
 Adeeb (1934–2006), Pakistani film actor
 Adeeb Ahamed, Indian businessman
 Adeeb Al-Haizan (born 2001), Saudi Arabian footballer
 Adeeb Khalid (born 1964), American professor

Adib
 Adib Barakat (born 1982), Syrian footballer
 Adib Boroumand (1924–2017), Iranian poet
 Adib Fahim (born 1980s), Afghan politician
 Adib Farhadi (born 1972), Afghan professor
 Adib Ishaq (1856–1885), Syrian literary figure
 Adib Domingos Jatene (1929–2014), Brazilian physician
 Adib Khan, Australian novelist
 Adib Khansari (1901–1982), Iranian musician
 Adib Kheir, Syrian nationalist
 Adib Raop (born 1999), Malaysian footballer
 Adib Sabir (died 1143 AD), Persian poet
 Adib Shishakli (1909–1964), Syrian military leader
 Adib Taherzadeh (1921–2000), Iranian Bahá'í Faith scholar
 Adib Zainudin (born 1995), Malaysian footballer

Adíb
 Hájí Mírzá Ḥasan-i-Adíbu'l-`Ulamá (1848–1919), eminent follower of Bahá'u'lláh, the founder of the Bahá'í Faith

Surname

Adeeb
 Ali al-Adeeb (born 1944), Iraqi politician
 Mirza Adeeb (1914–1999), Pakistani playwright

Adib
 Auguste Adib Pacha (1859–1936), Lebanese politician, writer and the first Prime Minister of Lebanon
 Mustapha Adib (activist) (born 1968), Moroccan human rights activist and ex-captain in the Royal Moroccan Air Force
 Mustapha Adib (politician) (born 1972), Lebanese diplomat, lawyer, educator, politician, researcher, academic and incumbent Prime Minister-designate of Lebanon

See also
Al Adib, Lebanese literary magazine published between 1942 and 1983
, coastal tanker
Thuban, star in the constellation Draco sometimes known as Adib

Arabic-language surnames
Arabic masculine given names
Iranian masculine given names
Pakistani masculine given names